Los Olivos Elementary School District is a public school district in Santa Barbara County, California, United States.

It operates a single school, Los Olivos Elementary School. The Olive Grove Charter School was previously affiliated with the school district, but is not anymore.

References

External links
 

School districts in Santa Barbara County, California